Takanea is a genus of moths in the family Lasiocampidae. The genus was erected by Nagano in 1917.

Selected species
Takanea diehli de Lajonquière, 1978
Takanea excisa (Wileman, 1910)
Takanea miyakei (Wileman, 1915)

References

Lasiocampidae